Liam Polworth (born 12 October 1994) is a Scottish professional footballer who plays as a midfielder for Kilmarnock. He has previously played for Inverness Caledonian Thistle, Motherwell and Dunfermline Athletic.

Early and personal life
Polworth was born in Inverness. His father Iain also played for Inverness.

Club career

Inverness Caledonian Thistle 
Polworth made his senior debut for Inverness Caledonian Thistle in the Scottish Premier League on 11 May 2011, becoming the club's youngest ever player, at the age of 16 years, 211 days. Polworth was an unused substitute as Inverness won the 2015 Scottish Cup Final. Polworth established himself in the first team during the 2015–16 season, scoring five goals from a midfield position. He signed a new three-year contract with Inverness in April 2016.

Motherwell 
On 17 April 2019, Polworth signed a pre-contract agreement with Motherwell, his first club after being at Inverness since the age of 8.

After rejecting a new contract in January 2021 and falling out with manager Graham Alexander, Polworth was made to train with the youth team.

On 24 May 2021, Motherwell announced that Polworth would be leaving the club at the end of the season when his contract expired.

Kilmarnock
He signed for Kilmarnock on 23 June 2021. On 28 February 2022, Polworth joined Scottish Championship side Dunfermline Athletic on loan for the remainder of the 2021–22 season.

International career
Polworth has represented Scotland at under-16 and under-17 youth levels. He made his debut appearance for the under-21 team during the 2015–16 season.

Career statistics

Honours
Inverness CT
Scottish Cup: 2014–15
Scottish Challenge Cup: 2017–18

References

1994 births
Living people
Scottish footballers
Inverness Caledonian Thistle F.C. players
Motherwell F.C. players
Kilmarnock F.C. players
Dunfermline Athletic F.C. players
Scottish Premier League players
Scottish Professional Football League players
Association football midfielders
Scotland youth international footballers
Footballers from Inverness
Scotland under-21 international footballers